Lovers Who Wander is the fourth studio album by the Del-Lords, released in 1990 through Enigma Records. The band supported the album with a North American tour. The album title comes from a Dion song.

Critical reception

The Washington Post wrote that "this band has been moving toward a traditional early-'60s New York rock sound: Springsteen territory, though the Lords aren't quite so overweening as the Boss." The Dallas Morning News determined that "the band displays its seemingly unerring knack for melding melodies that are as lasting as they are immediate with lyrics that act more as stories being told than merely words that sound good strung together." The Palm Beach Post concluded that "singer-guitarist Scott Kempner's thoughtful songs about the exhilaration and disappointment of love and romance deserve a hearing."

Track listing 
All songs written by Scott Kempner, except "Learn to Let Go" co-written by David Roter and "Stay With Me" co-written by Andy Shernoff.

Personnel 

The Del-Lords
Scott Kempner – lead vocals, guitar, twelve-string guitar, illustration
Eric Ambel – guitar, twelve-string guitar, acoustic guitar, Rickenbacker, vocals
Manny Caiati – bass guitar, Rhodes piano, vocals, production, mixing
Frank Funaro – drums, vocals

Additional musicians and production
Steve Aiken – illustration
Frank Caiati – vocal harmony
Charlie Giordano – keyboards
Jim Goatley – engineering
Mark Harder – engineering
Jerry – tambourine
Kenny Laguna – tambourine
Kenny Margolis – keyboards, organ, Hammond organ, piano
Manny Margolis – Hammond organ
Mike Meehan – assistant engineering
N.J. Nightingales – guitar
Thom Panunzio – production, mixing, tambourine
Jeannine Pinkerton – photography
Gray Russell – engineering, tambourine, vocals
Jenine Saccente – illustration, design
Snookie – additional vocals
Robert Spencer – illustration, art direction, photography, design, photography
Lisa Sutton – design, typography
Tish – additional vocals
Lou Whitney – associate producer, engineer
Jim Wunderle – vocals

References 

The Del-Lords albums
1990 albums
Enigma Records albums
Albums produced by Thom Panunzio